The Police Grounds are a set of cricket grounds in Harare. Located at the Morris Police Depot, the grounds have played host to first-class cricket. The 'A' ground first hosted first-class cricket in 1957, when Rhodesia played the touring Australians. The 'A' ground hosted 29 first-class matches for Rhodesia until 1968, most of which came in the Currie Cup. The 'B' ground began hosting first-class cricket in 1970, with Rhodesia playing against Transvaal. The 'B' ground hosted 27 first-class matches for Rhodesia until 1980, the majority of which came in the Currie Cup. The 'B' ground also played host to seven List A one-day matches from 1970 to 1978.

In addition to hosting cricket matches, the grounds have also hosted rugby union matches for the Zimbabwe rugby union team. It is known as the 'ceremonial home of Zimabwean rugby' and after a break of almost two decades, international rugby returned there in 2016.

Cricket records
NB: The first-class records listed below are a combination of records from both the 'A' and 'B' grounds.

First-class
Highest team total: 537 all out by KwaZulu-Natal v Rhodesia, 1964–65 on 'A' Ground
Lowest team total: 52 all out by Rhodesia v International Cavaliers, 1960–61 on 'A' Ground
Highest individual innings: 254 by Mike Procter for Rhodesia v Western Province, 1970–71 on 'B' Ground
Best bowling in an innings: 8-69 by Joe Partridge for Rhodesia v Natal, 1961–62 on 'A' Ground
Best bowling in a match: 14-101 by Joe Partridge for Rhodesia v Natal, as above

List A
Highest team total: 288 all out by Rhodesia v Natal, 1970–71
Lowest team total: 108 all out by Natal v Rhodesia, as above
Highest individual innings: 102 by Graeme Pollock for International Wanderers v Rhodesia, 1974–75
Best bowling in an innings: 3-21 by Richard Kaschula for Rhodesia v Natal, 1970–71

See also
List of cricket grounds in Zimbabwe

References

External links
Police 'A' Ground at ESPNcricinfo
Police 'B' Ground at ESPNcricinfo

Cricket grounds in Zimbabwe
Rugby union stadiums in Zimbabwe
Harare